Palaina is a genus of minute land snails with opercula, terrestrial gastropod mollusks or micromollusks in the family Diplommatinidae.

Species
Species in the genus Palaina include:
 
 Palaina adelpha Soós, 1911
 Palaina aerari (Dell, 1955)
 Palaina ainaro Köhler & Kessner, 2020
 Palaina albata  (Beddome, 1889)
 Palaina alberti Neubert & Bouchet, 2015
 Palaina albrechti Greķe, 2017
 Palaina amurensis (Mousson, 1887)
 Palaina angulata O. Boettger, 1891
 Palaina arborfumosa Shea & Griffiths, 2010
 Palaina ascendens (Mousson, 1870) second junior homonym of Palaina ascendens (E. von Martens, 1864)
 Palaina ascendens (E. von Martens, 1864)
 Palaina astenis Vermeulen, 1997
 Palaina attenboroughi Greķe, 2017
 Palaina bantimurungensis Maassen, 2003 
 Palaina beilanensis Preston, 1913
 Palaina bicornis van Benthem Jutting, 1958
 Palaina biroi Soós, 1911
 Palaina boucheti Tillier, 1981
 Palaina bougainvillei Greķe, 2017
 Palaina brandontrani Köhler & Kessner, 2020
 Palaina brazieri (Cox, 1870)
 Palaina bundiana Wiktor, 1998
 Palaina cantori (L. Pfeiffer, 1857)
 Palaina capillacea (Pfeiff., 1855)
 Palaina carbavica O. Boettger, 1891
 Palaina catanduanica Quadras & Möllendorff, 1895
 Palaina cenderawasih Greķe, 2021
 Palaina chalarostoma Quadras & Möllendorff, 1896
 Palaina chrysalis (Möllendorff, 1887)
 Palaina chrysostoma (E. A. Smith, 1897)
 Palaina citrinella van Benthem Jutting, 1963
 Palaina clappi Solem, 1960
 Palaina commixta I. Rensch, 1937
 Palaina consobrina van Benthem Jutting, 1963
 Palaina conspicua Möllendorff, 1893
 Palaina cristata Quadras & Möllendorff, 1893
 Palaina cupulifera van Benthem Jutting, 1963
 Palaina dautzenbergiana (Yen, 1948)
 Palaina deformis Quadras & Möllendorff, 1895
 Palaina deliciosa Iredale, 1944
 Palaina dianctoides Greķe, 2017
 Palaina diepenheimi (Preston, 1913)
 Palaina dimorpha Crosse, 1866
 Palaina doberai Greķe, 2017
 Palaina dohertyi E. A. Smith, 1897
 Palaina dohrni
 Palaina doliolum Möllendorff, 1897
 Palaina edwardi Iredale, 1944
 Palaina embra Iredale, 1944
 Palaina erythropeplos van Benthem Jutting, 1958
 Palaina eumirabilis Zilch, 1953
 Palaina evanescens Greķe, 2021
 Palaina extremita Greķe, 2017
 Palaina flammulata Neubert & Bouchet, 2015
 Palaina flavocylindrica Greķe, 2017
 Palaina floridensis Solem, 1960
 Palaina formosana Pilsbry & Y. Hirase, 1905
 Palaina francoisi Ancey, 1905
 Palaina gardneri Dell, 1955
 Palaina gedeana Möllendorff, 1897
 Palaina glabella Neubert & Bouchet, 2015 (primary homonym - invalid)
 Palaina glabella van Benthem Jutting, 1963 
 Palaina godeffroyana (Mousson, 1870)
 Palaina granulum I. Rensch & B. Rensch, 1929
 Palaina hartmanni Greķe, 2017
 Palaina hidalgoi Möllendorff, 1896
 Palaina hyalina Quadras & Möllendorff, 1894
 Palaina iha Greķe, 2017
 Palaina imperfecta Greķe, 2017
 Palaina inconspicua van Benthem Jutting, 1963
 Palaina insulana Greķe, 2017
 Palaina intercollis Shea & Griffiths, 2010
 Palaina kagainisi Greķe, 2021
 Palaina kitteli Neubert & Bouchet, 2015
 Palaina kubaryi Möllendorff, 1897
 Palaina kuniorum Tillier, 1981
* Palaina labeosa Neubert & Bouchet, 2015
 Palaina laszloi Greķe, 2017
 Palaina latecostata (Mousson, 1870)
 Palaina lengguru Greķe, 2017
 Palaina leptotoreutos van Benthem Jutting, 1958
 Palaina levicostulata Iredale, 1944
 Palaina liliputana van Benthem Jutting, 1963
 Palaina louisiade Greķe, 2017
 Palaina lucia Iredale, 1944
 Palaina macgillivrayi (Pfeiff., 1855)
 Palaina mairasiGreķe, 2017
 Palaina manggaraica (B. Rensch, 1931)
 Palaina marchei (Bavay, 1906)
 Palaina mareana Tillier, 1981
 Palaina mariei (Crosse, 1867)
 Palaina megalostoma Greķe, 2017
 Palaina mengen Greķe, 2017
 Palaina minuscularia Greķe, 2017
 Palaina minuta (H. Adams, 1868)
 Palaina minutula Greķe, 2017
 Palaina mirifica Greķe, 2017
 Palaina misoolensis Greķe, 2017
 Palaina modesta Quadras & Möllendorff, 1893
 Palaina moellendorffi (Fulton, 1899)
 Palaina montrouzieri (Crosse, 1874)
 Palaina morongensis Möllendorff, 1890
 Palaina moussoni Crosse, 1866
 Palaina mutis Greķe, 2017
 Palaina nanodes Tillier, 1981
 Palaina nicobarica (Godwin-Austen, 1886)
 Palaina nissidiophila Tillier, 1981
 Palaina novoguineensis E. A. Smith, 1897
 Palaina novopommerana I. Rensch & B. Rensch, 1929
 Palaina nubigena Möllendorff, 1897
 Palaina obesa (Hedley, 1898)
 Palaina obiensis Greķe, 2017
 Palaina onin Greķe, 2017
 Palaina opaoana Tillier, 1981
 Palaina orelimo Köhler & Kessner, 2020
 Palaina ovatula Möllendorff, 1897
 Palaina pagodula (Bavay & Dautzenberg, 1909)
 Palaina pallgergelyi Greķe, 2021
 Palaina papuamontis Greķe, 2017
 Palaina papuanorum Soós, 1911
 Palaina paradisaea Greķe, 2017
 Palaina parietalis Neubert & Bouchet, 2015
 Palaina patula Crosse, 1866
 Palaina paucicostata Pilsbry & Y. Hirase, 1905
 Palaina perroquini (Crosse, 1871)
 Palaina perspectiva Greķe, 2017
 Palaina platycheilus (Beddome, 1889)
 Palaina polystoma B. Rensch, 1931
 Palaina pomatiaeformis (Mousson, 1870)
 Palaina ponsonbyi Sykes, 1903
 Palaina porrecta Möllendorff, 1890
 Palaina propinqua van Benthem Jutting, 1963
 Palaina psittricha Greķe, 2017
 Palaina pumila van Benthem Jutting, 1959
 Palaina pupa Crosse, 1865
 Palaina pusilla Martens, 1877
 Palaina quadrasi (Möllendorff, 1887)
 Palaina quadricornis van Benthem Jutting, 1958
 Palaina repandostoma van Benthem Jutting, 1963
 Palaina rubella (Beddome, 1889)
 Palaina sarmi Greķe, 2021
 Palaina saxatilis Greķe, 2021
 Palaina saxicola (Möllendorff, 1887)
 Palaina scalarina Möllendorff, 1897
 Palaina scaveola van Benthem Jutting, 1958
 Palaina schneideri I. Rensch & B. Rensch, 1929
 Palaina semperi Kobelt, 1902
 Palaina silvicultrix Greķe, 2017
 Palaina slapcinskyi Greķe, 2017
 Palaina solomonensis (Dell, 1955)
 Palaina sparselamellata Greķe, 2017
 Palaina strigataCrosse, 1866
 Palaina striolataCrosse, 1866
 Palaina subregularis (Mousson, 1870)
 Palaina sulcata Neubert & Bouchet, 2015
 Palaina sulcicollis (Möllendorff, 1897)
 Palaina taeniolataQuadras & Möllendorff, 1894
 Palaina tanimbarensis Greķe, 2017
 Palaina telnovi Greķe, 2017
 Palaina thomasrinteleni Greķe, 2017
 Palaina trachelostropha Möllendorff, 1890
 Palaina truncata Neubert & Bouchet, 2015
 Palaina tuba Köhler & Kessner, 2020
 Palaina tuberosa (Mousson, 1870)
 Palaina tuberosissima Neubert & Bouchet, 2015
 Palaina tumens (Fulton, 1899)
 Palaina ulingensis (Möllendorff, 1887)
 Palaina vermeuleni Greķe, 2017
 Palaina vilarensis Zilch, 1953
 Palaina vulcanicola Vermeulen, 1996
 Palaina waigeo Greķe, 2017
 Palaina waterhousei Iredale, 1944
 Palaina wawiyai Greķe, 2017
 Palaina wezendonki Maassen, 2003;
 Palaina wilsoni Crosse, 1866
 Palaina wisemani (Cox, 1870)
 Palaina xiphidium Möllendorff, 1897
 Palaina yamdena Greķe, 2017

References

 Yamazaki, K.; Yamazaki, M.; Ueshima, R. (2013). Systematic review of diplommatinid land snails (Caenogastropoda, Diplommatinidae) endemic to the Palau Islands.(1) Generic classification and revision of Hungerfordia species with highly developed axial ribs. Zootaxa. 3743(1), 1-71

External links
 Semper O. (1865). Notice préliminaire sur la famille des Diplommatinacées. Journal de Conchyliologie. 13: 289-294
 Möllendorff, O. F. von. (1897). Neue Landschnecken von Java. Nachrichtsblatt der Deutschen Malakozoologischen Gesellschaft. 29(7-8): 57–72, 89–97
 Pease, W. H. (1865). Descriptions of new species of Phaneropneumona, inhabiting Polynesia. American Journal of Conchology. 1(4): 287-291.
 Martens, E. von. (1867). Die Landschnecken. Die Preussische Expedition nach Ost-Asien. Nach amtlichen Quellen. Zoologischer Teil. Zweiter Band: XII + 447, 22 plates; Königliche Geheime Ober-Hofbuchdruckerei, Berlin
 Kobelt W. (1902). Das Tierreich. Eine Zusammenstellung und Kennzeichnung der rezenten Tierformen. 16. Lieferung. Mollusca. Cyclophoridae. Das Tierreich. XXXIX + 662 pp., 1 map. [July]. Berlin (R. Friedländer).
 Iredale, T. (1944). The land Mollusca of Lord Howe Island. The Australian Zoologist. 10(3): 299-334.

 
Fauna of Micronesia
Gastropod genera
Molluscs of Oceania
Molluscs of the Pacific Ocean
Diplommatinidae
Taxonomy articles created by Polbot